New York State Route 361 (NY 361) was a state highway located in Dutchess County, New York, in the United States. The southern terminus of the route was at the Connecticut state line, where it continued to Sharon, Connecticut, as Route 361. The northern terminus was at U.S. Route 44 (US 44) in Millerton. NY 361 was designated in April 1935 and removed from the state highway system and replaced with County Route 62 (CR 62) in 1980 as part of a large-scale highway maintenance swap between the New York State Department of Transportation and the Dutchess County highway department.

Route description

NY 361 began as a continuation of Connecticut's Route 361 adjacent to the bi-state water body of Indian Lake in the town of North East. The route traveled northward on Sharon Road, paralleling the Webatuck Creek to Millerton, where it became South Maple Avenue and terminated at an intersection with US 44 (Main Street). The road itself, however, continued northward to NY 22 in the hamlet of Mount Riga as North Maple Avenue and, outside the village, Rudd Pond Road, connecting Millerton to the Rudd Pond area of Taconic State Park.

History
NY 361 was assigned in April 1931 to a short north–south highway connecting US 44 in Millerton to Route 4 (later Route 361) at the Connecticut state line. The route remained unchanged until April 1, 1980, when ownership and maintenance of the route was transferred to Dutchess County as part of a large scale highway maintenance swap. As part of the swap, NY 361, the routing of NY 82A from Amenia to Pine Plains, NY 402, and three reference routes near the hamlets of Barrytown (near Red Hook), Pine Plains, and East Park (near Hyde Park) were given to the county by the New York State Department of Transportation in exchange for maintenance of the segment of NY 82 between NY 199 and the Columbia County line. Also exchanged was a county route bypassing Millbrook to the northwest (which became NY 44A and later US 44), the portion of the Salt Point Turnpike north of Smith Street in Poughkeepsie (NY 115), and Spackenkill Road between US 9 and NY 376 in Poughkeepsie (NY 113). The former routing of NY 361 is now part of CR 62, which continues north of US 44 to NY 22 in Mount Riga.

Major intersections

See also

List of county routes in Dutchess County, New York

References

External links

361
Transportation in Dutchess County, New York